The 2015 Internazionali di Tennis Castel del Monte was a professional tennis tournament played on indoor carpet courts. It was the third edition of the tournament which was part of the 2015 ATP Challenger Tour. It took place in Andria, Italy between November 23 and November 29, 2015.

Singles main-draw entrants

Seeds

 1 Rankings are as of November 18, 2015.

Other entrants
The following players received wildcards into the singles main draw:
  Luca Vanni
  Julian Ocleppo
  Andrea Pellegrino
  Mario Giuseppe Nicosia

The following players received entry into the singles main draw with a protected ranking:
  Marco Chiudinelli

The following players received entry from the qualifying draw:
  Joris De Loore
  Lorenzo Sonego
  Petru-Alexandru Luncanu
  Mate Pavić

The following player received as a lucky loser:
  Viktor Galović

Champions

Singles

 Ivan Dodig def.  Michael Berrer 6–2, 6–1

Doubles

 Marco Chiudinelli /  Frank Moser def.  Carsten Ball /  Dustin Brown 7–6(7–5), 7–5

External links
Official Website

Internazionali di Tennis Castel del Monte
Internazionali di Tennis Castel del Monte
2015 in Italian tennis